State Road 535 (SR 535) is a state highway in the U.S. state of Florida.  The road begins at U.S. Route 192 (US 192) in Kissimmee, heading north, ending at Interstate 4 (I-4) at Lake Buena Vista.  Continuing north the road becomes County Road 535 (CR 535). The road is known as Vineland Road in Osceola County and Apopka-Vineland Road in Orange County.

Route description

SR 535 begins at an intersection with US 192/SR 530 in Kissimmee, Osceola County, heading north on Vineland Road, a six-lane divided highway. The road passes several businesses, curving to the northwest. The state road comes to an interchange with CR 522 (Osceola Parkway), with access to and from the eastbound direction of the Osceola Parkway. Access to and from the westbound direction is provided by North Poinciana Boulevard, which intersects SR 535 a short distance to the north. Past this, the road passes between businesses to the southwest and woods to the northeast, crossing into Lake Buena Vista in Orange County and becoming Kissimmee-Vineland Road. SR 535 heads through dense woods, passing to the west of the Lake Buena Vista Factory Stores before crossing under the SR 417 toll road without an interchange. The road intersects International Drive before reaching a junction with SR 536 in a commercial area. SR 536 heads west to provide access to the Walt Disney World Resort and east to northbound SR 417. Past this intersection, the state road passes through areas of resorts and businesses, curving to the north. SR 535 comes to an interchange with I-4/SR 400. Past this interchange, SR 535 officially ends and the road continues north as CR 535 (Apopka-Vineland Road). Despite this, SR 535 signage continues along CR 535 to an intersection with Palm Parkway/Winter Garden-Vineland Road, where CR 535 turns west onto Winter Garden-Vineland Road and CR 435 continues north along Apopka-Vineland Road.

Major intersections

References

External links

535
535
535
535